John Melville Kerr (May 22, 1903 - August 9, 1980) is a Canadian-born former major league baseball player.

During his minor league career, Kerr was an outfielder. On September 16, 1925, he became only the second Manitoban to make the majors. In that game, which was his only major league appearance, he came on as a pinch runner for the Chicago Cubs. Kerr scored a run for the only run of his career.

External links 

1903 births
1980 deaths
Baseball people from Manitoba
Canadian expatriate baseball players in the United States
Chicago Cubs players
Major League Baseball players from Canada
People from Souris, Manitoba